The NABC Coach of the Year Award has been presented by the National Association of Basketball Coaches since . A longtime sponsor of the award was Kodak; it is currently sponsored by the UPS Store.

NCAA Division I Coaches of the Year

NCAA Division II Coaches of the Year

NCAA Division III Coaches of the Year

References

External links

Awards established in 1959
College basketball coach of the year awards in the United States
National Association of Basketball Coaches